Timbre is the third album by American singer-songwriter Sophie B. Hawkins, released in 1999 (see 1999 in music). This album was re-released in 2001 with a bonus disc. One release has censored lyrics in "The Darkest Childe" and "Help Me Breathe".

Track listing
All songs written by Sophie B. Hawkins.

"Strange Thing" – 3:53
"No Connection" – 4:48
"32 Lines" – 5:02
"MMM My Best Friend" – 4:41
"Bare the Weight of Me" – 4:29
"Nocturne" – 4:08
"The Darkest Childe" – 5:54
"I Walk Alone" – 4:12
"Your Tongue Like the Sun in My Mouth" – 5:43
"Lose Your Way" – 4:04
"Help Me Breathe" – 5:42
"The One You Have Not Seen" – 6:09

2001 re-release bonus disc
"You Turn Me On" (new song demo)
"Travelling Light" (new song demo)
"I Walk Alone" (Timbre demo)
"No Connection" (Timbre demo)
"Walking in My Blue Jeans" (radio edit)
"Lose Your Way" (Bounce Remix)
"Lose Your Way" (Spanish remix)

The bonus disc also includes video enhancement:
Video biography
"No Connection" (video)
"The One You Have Not Seen" (video/home demo version)
The Cream Will Rise Sundance promo

Personnel
Sophie B. Hawkins – synthesizer, acoustic guitar, banjo, percussion, piano, electric guitar, keyboards, marimba, vocals, vibraphone, djembe, udu

Additional personnel
Joe Bashorun – synthesizer, keyboards
Paul Bushnell – bass guitar
Jon Clarke – oboe
Steve Ferrone – drums
Stefanie Fife – cello
Mark Goldenberg – guitar
Michael Landau – synthesizer, guitar
Gerry Leonard – guitar
Robin Lorenz – violin
Novi Novog – viola
David Rubenstein – string conductor
Larry Saltzman – synthesizer, guitar
Carlos Vega – drums
Skip Waring – trumpet

Production
Producer: Sophie B. Hawkins
Executive producer: Peter Asher, Kevin Killen
Engineers: Sophie B. Hawkins, Kevin Killen, Nathaniel Kunkel
Assistant engineer: Al Sanderson
Mixing: Kevin Killen
Remixing: Mike Shipley
Mastering: Bob Ludwig
Editing: Chris Fudurich
Programming: Chris Fudurich
Arrangers: Sophie B. Hawkins, Joe Bashorun, Stefanie Fife, Robin Lorenz, Novi Novog
String arrangements: David Rubenstein
Loops: Sophie B. Hawkins, Chris Fudurich
Production coordination: Ivy Skoff
Assistants: David Baerwald, Marnie Lehman-Riley
Art direction: Christine Wilson
Design: Christine Wilson

Notes

External links
 Full lyrics of all tracks at official website

Sophie B. Hawkins albums
1999 albums